XHSIC-FM is a radio station on 96.1 FM in Córdoba, Veracruz. It is owned by Grupo Radiorama and carries its La Bestia Grupera grupera format.

History
XESIC-AM received its concession on November 21, 1988. It was owned by Marco Aurelio Moncada Krauss and broadcast with 1,000 watts on 670 kHz. Moncada Krauss had been fighting for a station for years, placing a bid on what had been designated "XERFC" on 1410 kHz in 1973. It soon affiliated to Grupo ACIR and was then sold to Radiorama.

XESIC moved to FM in 2010.

References

Radio stations in Veracruz
Radio stations established in 1988